Malaccensis  may refer to:

Plants
 Actinodaphne malaccensis, a species of tree in the family Lauraceae native to Malaysia and Singapore
 Aglaia malaccensis, a species of plant in the family Meliaceae found in Southeast Asia
 Alpinia malaccensis, a plant in the family Zingiberaceae native to Indonesia and Malaysia
 Aquilaria malaccensis, a species of tree in the family Thymelaeaceae found in Southeast Asia
 Koompassia malaccensis, a tropical rainforest tree species in the family Fabaceae found in Southeast Asia
 Lasiococca malaccensis, a synonym of Lasiococca brevipes, a tree species found in Southeast Asia
 Lindera malaccensis, a synonym for Lindera lucida, a plant species found in Malaysia
 Madhuca malaccensis, a tree in the family Sapotaceae found in Southeast Asia
 Pouteria malaccensis, a tree in the family Sapotaceae found in Southeast Asia

Beetle species in the family Cerambycidae
 Acalolepta malaccensis
 Blepephaeus malaccensis
 Cylindrepomus malaccensis
 Falsoparmena malaccensis
 Gyaritus malaccensis
 Pothyne malaccensis
 Sybra malaccensis